The Aquarius 21 is an American trailerable sailboat that was designed by Peter Barrett as a cruiser and first built in 1969.

The design was also sold in slightly modified form as the Aquarius Pelican from about 1978 and, later, the Balboa 21.

Production
The design was built by Coastal Recreation, Inc in the United States, but it is now out of production.

Design
The Aquarius 21 is a recreational sailboat, built predominantly of fiberglass, with wood trim. It has a fractional sloop rig, a spooned raked stem, an angled transom, a "pop-top" cabin, a transom-hung rudder controlled by a tiller and a retractable centerboard.

The boat is normally fitted with a small  outboard motor for docking and maneuvering.

The design has sleeping accommodation for four people, with a double "V"-berth in the bow cabin and two quarter berths in the main cabin, under the cockpit. The galley is located on the port side just forward of the companionway ladder. The galley is equipped with a stove and a sink. The head is located under the bow cabin "V" berth, on the port side.

Variants
Aquarius 21
This model was introduced in 1969 and built until 1977.
Aquarius Pelican
This model was introduced in 1978 and incorporated minor changes.
Balboa 21

Operational history
In a 2010 review Steve Henkel indicated that even though the boat was sold as sleeping four people, he would not recommend having more than two people on board overnight.

See also
List of sailing boat types

Related development
Aquarius 23
Balboa 16
Balboa 20
Balboa 22
Balboa 23
Balboa 24

References

1960s sailboat type designs
Sailing yachts
Trailer sailers
Sailboat type designs by Peter Barrett
Sailboat types built by Coastal Recreation, Inc